The 2019–20 Atlético San Luis season is the 7th season in the football club's history and the 1st season in the top flight of Mexican football. For the season, Atlético San Luis will compete in the Apertura and Clausura tournaments as well as in the Copa MX.

Coaching staff

Transfers

In

Competitions

Overview

Torneo Apertura

League table

Results summary

Result round by round

Matches

Copa MX

Group stage

Statistics

Squad statistics

Goals

Hat-tricks

Clean sheets

Own goals

Disciplinary record

References

External links

Mexican football clubs 2019–20 season